Marilyn! The Musical is a musical written by Mort Garson about Marilyn Monroe that was originally produced in London in 1983 as a vehicle for Stephanie Lawrence.

The show's book and lyrics were by Jacques Wilson and it opened at the Adelphi Theatre on 17 March 1983 where it ran for 156 performances.

Directed by Larry Fuller, with whom Lawrence had worked on Evita, the principal cast also included John Christie, John Bennett, David Firth, Bruce Barry and Judith Bruce.

Despite poor reviews for the show, Lawrence's performance was praised.

Cast
Camera - John Christie
Norma-Jean/Marilyn - Stephanie Lawrence
Paula Strasberg/Foster Parent - Myra Sands
Jack Warner/Foster Parent - David Shelmerdine
Louella Parsons/Mrs. Dougherty - Margaret Burton
Jim Dougherty - Clive Carter
Mama - Judith Bruce
Mrs. Miller/Nurse - Shirley Greenwood
Norma Jean's Mambo Partner - Brad Graham
Hedda Hopper/Emmeline Snivelli - Marie Lorraine
Andre De Dienes - Bruce Barry
Starlets - Diane SimmonsLindsey LomaxRossana Dane
Lee Strasberg/Johnny Hyde - John Bennett
Harry Cohn - Stanley Fleet
Darryl Zanuck - Chuck Julian
Jimmy Fiddler - David Oakley
Joe Di Maggio - Stuart Milligan
Arthur Miller - David Firth
Mr. Miller - Richard Lloyd-Morgan
Female Wedding Guest - Helen Hembrough
Male Wedding Guest - Phillip Harrison

Musical numbers 
 Did You Know Marilyn Monroe?
 I Am Camera
 Somebody Will Love Me
 What Do We Do With the Girl?
 Can You Hear Me Mama?
 The Most Beautiful Girl of Them All
 8 x 10 Glossies
 Where Do You Want Me?
 I Never Knew A Girl Like Her Before
 Seeing Other Men
 Come and Get It
 It Happens
 The Man Has Got An Eye
 I Can See Myself Very Clearly
 To Love Somebody
 Then The Town Comes Down on Your Head
 I'm Going Public
 So Happy to See Me
 Who's That Girl?
 How Do You Like It?
 Bigger Than Life
 A Girl Like You Needs A Little Protection
 There's So Much to Do in New York
 Dumb Blonde
 The Wedding
 The Scene Will Play
 Beautiful Child
 It Was Not Meant to Be
 Somewhere a Phone is Ringing

References

Also see
Marilyn: An American Fable
Bombshell

1983 musicals
West End musicals
British musicals
Cultural depictions of Marilyn Monroe
Cultural depictions of Joe DiMaggio
Plays based on real people